The Brunei Football Association used to enter a team in Malaysian football competitions. The team won the Malaysia Cup in 1999. The team played at the 35,000-seat Hassanal Bolkiah National Stadium in Bandar Seri Begawan.

History
Brunei first entered the Malaysian football league competitions in 1979. When the Liga Semi-Pro was introduced in Malaysia in 1989, Brunei also were invited along with Singapore, the other foreign team in Malaysian competition. Historically Brunei were the lower ranked team in Malaysian competition, often finishing at the lower rung of the league table and knocked out in the early stages of Malaysia Cup. However, their highest achievement in Malaysian competition was winning the Malaysia Cup in 1999, the first time they had won the competition. Brunei's final season in the Malaysian competition was in 2005 Liga Premier. Starting from 2006 until 2008, the only professional club in Brunei, DPMM FC replaced them as Brunei's representation in Malaysian competitions.

Final Squad
Squad for the 2005 Malaysia Premier League season.

Honours
 Malaysia Cup
 Winners (1): 1999
 Piala Sumbangsih
 Runners-up (1): 2000

See also
 DPMM FC (Duli Pengiran Muda Mahkota FC)
 Brunei national football team

References

Association football clubs established in 1956
Football clubs in Brunei
Expatriated football clubs
Malaysia Cup winners
1956 establishments in Brunei
Defunct football clubs in Malaysia
Association football clubs disestablished in 2005